"Hell No (Leave Home)" is a song by American singer Monica featuring guest vocals by rapper Twista. It was written by Bryan Michael Cox, Sean Garrett, and Carl Mitchell and produced by former for her fourth studio album, The Makings of Me (2006), with additional production from Garrett. The song was released as the album's fourth and final single on May 14, 2007 in the United States, where it peaked at number 14 on the US Billboard Bubbling Under R&B/Hip-Hop Songs.

Background
"Hell No (Leave Home)" was written by Bryan Michael Cox, Sean Garrett, and Carl "Twista" Mitchell, while production was helmed by the former. Garrett received co-producer credit on the song. "Hell No (Leave Home)" has Monica trading verses with fast-paced rapper Twista. The singer called the recording of the rhymes "comical," telling Ballerstatus in an interview: "He [Twista] had so much patience with me and allowed me to learn his way of rapping. Of course, rapping isn't what I do, but I did enjoy the experience. The way I learned best was with him in the booth."

Track listings

Credits and personnel
Credits lifted from the liner notes of The Makings of Me.
 
 
 Monica Arnold – background vocals, vocals
Candice Childress – production coordination
Bryan Michael Cox – instruments, producer, writer
Sean Garrett – co-producer, writer
 
S. Vaughn Merrick – vocal recording
Carl Mitchell – vocals, writer
Phil Tan – mixing
Sam Thomas – additional re-recording, editing

Charts

Release history

References

2006 songs
2007 singles
Monica (singer) songs
Songs written by Sean Garrett
Songs written by Bryan-Michael Cox
Songs written by Twista